The Morodok Techo National Stadium is a football and athletics stadium in Phnom Penh, Cambodia. It is the main venue of the larger Morodok Techo National Sports Complex.

Construction
The Morodok Techo National Sports Complex, which includes the main stadium, was constructed specifically for Cambodia's hosting of the 2023 Southeast Asian Games. Construction of the sports complex began in April 2013 while the construction of the main stadium began in August 2017. The groundbreaking ceremony for the stadium was held earlier on April 4, 2017. The Chinese government provided 1.1 billion Chinese yuan (about $160 million) aid for the construction of the stadium which was developed by the China State Construction Engineering Corporation. Around 340 Chinese engineers and 240 Cambodian workers and technicians were involved in the construction. By January 2019 the installation of seats was completed.

Architecture and design
The structure of the Morodok Techo National Stadium was designed to resemble a sailing ship. It is a symbol of Cambodia-China relations, as the first Chinese people in the country came by these ships. The whole stadium's design is based on the Rumduol flower and a moat surrounds it, similar to those used in the Angkor Wat. The stadium has a seating capacity of 60,000 people.

Cricket

The first ICC International match was held on 8 February 2023 when Cambodia hosted a bilateral series against Singapore.

International Record

Women's Twenty20 International five-wicket hauls
The following table summarizes the five-wicket hauls taken in WT20Is at this venue.

References

Sport in Phnom Penh
Football venues in Cambodia